Togo first competed at the Paralympic Games in 2016, at the Summer Games in Rio de Janeiro, Brazil. Togo sent one athlete to compete in Powerlifting events. This paralympian competed from a wheelchair. Togo has never taken part in the Winter Paralympic Games, and no athlete from the country has ever won a Paralympic medal.

Full results for Togo at the Paralympics

See also
 Togo at the Olympics

References

 
Sport in Togo